This is a list of major cities and towns which belonged to the Kingdom of Galicia and Lodomeria from the Congress of Vienna in 1815 until the dissolution of Austria-Hungary in 1918. Between those dates, the Kingdom of Galicia and Lodomeria consisted mostly of the territories gained by the Habsburg Empire in the First Partition of Poland in 1772. 

Today, the territory of Galicia is split between Poland in the west and Ukraine in the east. At the turn of the Twentieth Century, Poles constituted 88.7% of the whole population of Western Galicia, Jews 7.6%, Ukrainians 3.2%, Germans 0.3%, and others 0.2%. Respective data for Eastern Galicia show the following number: Ukrainians 60.5%, Poles 25.0%, Jews 13.7%, Germans 0.3%, and others 0.5%. Before World War II, many Galician towns, even in the predominantly ethnic Ukrainian east, had substantial Polish, Jewish and German populations.

In 1931, 93% Poles, 5% Jews, 2% others (mainly Ukrainians and Germans) lived in Western Galicia. While 52% Ukrainians, 35% Poles, 10% Jews, 3% others (mainly Germans and Armenians) lived in Eastern Galicia.

Ukraine

Poland

See also 
 Galicia (Eastern Europe)
 Kingdom of Galicia and Lodomeria
 List of shtetls

Towns
Galicia and Lodomeria
Galicia and Lodomeria